John George Spanswick (30 September 1933 – 15 October 2016) was an English cricketer who played first-class cricket for Kent County Cricket Club in the 1950s. Spanswick was a right-handed batsman who bowled right-arm medium-fast. He was born at Folkestone in Kent and was educated at Whitgift School.

Spanswick made his first-class debut for Kent against Middlesex in the 1955 County Championship.  He made 15 further first-class appearances for the county, the last of which came against Cambridge University in 1956.  In his 16 first-class appearances for Kent, he took 36 wickets at an average of 32.63, with best figures of 4/64.  He scored a total of 135 runs at an average of 6.42, with a high score of 24.

Spanswick died on 15 October 2016 at the age of 83.

References

External links

1933 births
2016 deaths
People from Folkestone
People educated at Whitgift School
English cricketers
Kent cricketers